Nyírmező is the Hungarian name for two villages in Romania:

 Poiana Aiudului village, Livezile Commune, Alba County
 Mermezeu-Văleni village, Geoagiu Town, Hunedoara County